Coryton is a hamlet and civil parish in the West Devon district of Devon, England, to the north west of Tavistock.

Coryton is in the valley of the River Lyd. It has a church and a former mill. There was formerly a railway station on the Launceston and South Devon Railway (later part of the GWR), closed in 1962.

Coryton House is a former rectory built in 1836. It is a Grade II listed building.

References

External links

Dartmoor
Hamlets in Devon